A One Day International (ODI) is an international cricket match between two representative teams, each having ODI status, as determined by the International Cricket Council (ICC). An ODI differs from Test matches in that the number of overs per team is limited, and that each team has only one innings, 139 players have represented the Bangladesh national team in ODIs, since its debut in 1986.

Bangladesh gained ODI status on the 10 October 1997 following their win at the 1997 ICC Trophy. Previously they held special ODI status for the Asia Cup between 1986 and 1995 with an appearance at the 1990 Austral-Asia Cup. The team's first appearance in a One Day International was at the 1986 Asia Cup where was defeated by seven wickets over Pakistan and it would twelve years until they recorded their first victory against Kenya in 1998 in their twenty-third ODI which at the time was a record.

This list includes all players who have played at least one ODI match and is initially arranged in the order of debut appearance. Where more than one player won their first cap in the same match, those players are initially listed alphabetically at the time of debut.

Key

List of players
Last updated 6 March 2023.

Notes:
1 Mohammad Rafique, Mohammad Ashraful and Mashrafe Mortaza also played 2 ODI matches for the Asia XI. Only their records for Bangladesh are given above.

See also
One Day International
Bangladesh national cricket team
List of Bangladesh Test cricketers
List of Bangladesh Twenty20 International cricketers

References 

ODI
Bangladesh